Air Cdre James Michael Birkin CB DSO OBE DFC AFC DL RAF (23 April 1912 – 17 November 1985) was a Royal Air Force officer.

He served during the Second World War where he was awarded the AFC (1942), DFC (1944) and DSO (1944). After the war he was aide-de-camp to Queen Elizabeth II from 1957 to 1963, and High Sheriff of the Isle of Wight.

References 

1912 births
1985 deaths
High Sheriffs of the Isle of Wight
Companions of the Order of the Bath
Companions of the Distinguished Service Order
Officers of the Order of the British Empire